Elgin/Third Ward is a light rail station in Houston, Texas on the METRORail system. It is served by the Purple Line and is located on Scott Street at Elgin Street in the Third Ward.

Elgin/Third Ward station opened on May 23, 2015.

The station is proposed as a transfer station for the University Line.

References

METRORail stations
Railway stations in the United States opened in 2015
2015 establishments in Texas
Railway stations in Texas at university and college campuses
Third Ward, Houston
Railway stations in Harris County, Texas